The following article is a ranked list of Salvadoran departments.

By area
The following table presents a listing of El Salvador's 14 departments ranked in order of their surface area.

By population
The following table presents a listing of El Salvador's 14 departments ranked in order of their total population (based on 2006 population estimates).

See also
El Salvador
Departments of El Salvador
Geography of El Salvador
List of Salvadoran departmental capitals
Salvadoran Departments by HDI

El Salvador
 
Lists of subdivisions of El Salvador